The Lucid Air is a battery electric car produced and marketed by Lucid Motors. Unveiled in December 2016, it is designed to compete with existing brands in the electric vehicle (EV) industry, in particular the Tesla Model S Plaid, the Fisker 
Karma, the Porsche Taycan, as well as other brands in the luxury car segment, including Mercedes-Benz, BMW and Audi.

The production version was unveiled in September 2020, and Lucid begun production in late 2021.

The announced range of trim levels includes Pure, Touring, Grand Touring, and Dream Edition versions.

On September 28, 2021, Lucid Motors announced that production had begun and that deliveries of the top-of-the-line Lucid Air Dream Edition would start in late October 2021, with deliveries of the base Pure model expected in late 2022. Deliveries commenced on October 30, 2021, with the very first reservation holders taking delivery of Air Dream Editions in an event in California.



History 
The Lucid Air was conceived in the early 2010s, with a prototype unveiled to the public in 2016, and the production version unveiled in September 2020, with production planned to start in 2021.

Lucid entered into a partnership deal with Samsung SDI on December 2, 2016, for battery procurement.

In 2016, Lucid Motors created a delivery van prototype of its electric powertrain for the Air using batteries from its former brand, Atieva. Combined with all-wheel drive and other physical and software updates, Edna was able to achieve a 0– time of 2.74 seconds and quarter mile time of 11.3 seconds. According to Lucid Motors, Edna was used to test the performance and real world functionality of its powertrain, including "motor control algorithms, regenerative braking behaviors, accelerator pedal feel, and cooling strategies".

In 2018, a modified Lucid Air prototype set an EV lap record of 1:41.67 at the Laguna Seca track, beating the Jaguar I Pace by seven seconds, previously holding a previous record of 1:48.18. Featured as a prototype, the Air was equipped with "Pirelli P Zero PZ4 summer tires, modified high temperature brake pads and fluid, a 6 point roll cage and fire suppression system".

In 2018, Lucid Motors closed a  investment deal with Saudi Arabia's Public Investment Fund to fund the Air's production. Production was then expected to commence in late 2020 following the construction of the Lucid factory in Casa Grande, Arizona.

By May 2019, the Air was available for pre-order in the United States and Canada, with plans stated to move to China as well. In an interview, CEO Peter Rawlinson stated that China would pose as a significant market for Lucid Motors due to their intensive usage patterns, which the Air is best suited for.

In a 2019 interview, Rawlinson outlined that the US$100,000-plus vehicle could be seen as the first stage of a much bigger vision, which is to achieve a level of energy efficiency that combined with an ubiquitous fast charging network, will counteract the need for bigger sized batteries. Rawlinson specified that Lucid Motors aims to improve energy efficiency to be  / kWh as opposed to an industry average of  / kWh. Rawlinson further outlined then that the price of batteries was expected to drop to US$100 / kWh within the next decade, which he believes will enable Lucid Motors to produce a luxury EV for less than US$30,000.

On June 30, 2020, Lucid Motors said that they expected the Lucid Air to be "the world's most aerodynamically efficient luxury car when it goes into production". The company "achieved a new benchmark in aerodynamic efficiency for its luxury electric car...with tests recently completed at Windshear's advanced rolling-road wind tunnel, the automaker verified a coefficient of drag of 0.21."

On May 5, 2022, Lucid Motors announced that it was raising prices of the variants of its luxury Air sedan, beginning June 1. The price hikes would push the base price of the Air sedan up as much as 13%.

Overview

Design
The Air has been designed to compete in the luxury sports segment against the Tesla Model S as well as high-line models from German car manufacturers. Its goal is to match the ability of sport coupes, but has a greater interior space, with a smaller external length and width. The exterior design was led by Derek Jenkins.

On September 9, 2020, the Lucid Air was officially unveiled, and on November 24, 2020, Lucid Motors detailed the full range including the Lucid Air Pure, Touring, Grand Touring and Dream Edition.

Range 

A 2022 test drive revealed that the Grand Touring model only managed 410 miles; however, this was still the first EV tested by Car and Driver to top 400 miles.

DreamDrive (ADAS) 
On July 29, 2020, Lucid Motors announced DreamDrive, an Advanced Driver-Assistance System (ADAS) which will debut in the Air. The DreamDrive sensor suite has 32 sensors in total, including "14 cameras: Three forward-facing, four side- and rear-facing, four surround-view, a rear-facing, a rear-facing fisheye, and lastly, a driving monitoring one. There are five radar units. One is a forward-facing long-range sensor, and the other four are short-range ones. Twelve short-range ultrasonic sensors handle near-field detection, and lastly, a high-resolution, long-range, 125-beam (equivalent), forward-facing Lidar maps the three-dimensional space ahead of the car."

Aerodynamics 
Rawlinson claims the Air has less drag than the Mercedes-Benz EQS due to a smaller frontal area.

Powertrain 

Lucid Motors uses lithium-ion battery cells sourced from LG Chem to supply the Air's primary powertrain.

The Air Dream Edition Range will have a 112 kWh battery pack which will provide an estimated  of EPA range.

, the most efficient version on sale in the US, the Air Grand Touring with 19-in wheels, has an EPA rated energy efficiency of 26 kWh/, which is equivalent to 1.8 litres/100 km of gasoline.

Later independent reporting on real-world testing (drag strip performance times) showed the  Air Dream variant achieving a  time of 10 seconds flat. The test providers noted that conditions on that particular day were suboptimal (colder than ideal temperature for example), leading them to speculate that  mile times closer to 9.8 seconds could be achieved under friendlier conditions.

Battery/charging 
Lucid Motors plans to offer a nationwide charging plan to customers in the US through its joint agreement with Electrify America. The 800-volt DC charging system, first used by the Porsche Taycan, allows variable voltages up to 1000 volts, and thus is fully compatible with Lucid's 924-volt electrical architecture. When used with a 300 kW or higher charging station, the vehicle can gain 300 miles of range in 20 minutes.  The vehicle features a bidirectional rectifier capable of supplying up to 19.2 kW (240V ~ 80A) of AC power that could power a home or other load.

It upconverts 400-volt or lower power coming from a charger to its operating voltage. It downconverts the battery pack's 900 volts to 400 volts to power other loads in the vehicle or to charge another vehicle.

The company claims that its 2170 cells differ significantly from normal lithium ion cells due to their tolerance of repeated cyclic fast charging and non-use for a prolonged period of time while maintaining capacity.

Features 

Other options include: "active suspension, a panoramic sunroof, executive rear seats that can recline up to 55 degrees, a 29 speaker sound system with noise cancellation, 20 or 21-inch alloy wheels, and 22-way electric adjustment front seats with ventilation, dynamic bolsters and massage."

Reception
The car was chosen as one of the Top 10 Tech Cars by the IEEE in 2018 and is the 2022 Motor Trend Car of the Year.

Models

References

Further reading
 Felton, Ryan. Electric Startup Lucid Motors is Doing One Big Thing Right Jalopnik. Retrieved 2019-05-30.
 Wong, Raymond. Sorry Tesla, but the Lucid Air is way more luxurious and spacious Mashable. Retrieved 2019-05-30

External links 

 

Production electric cars
Electric sports cars
Sports sedans
Euro NCAP executive cars
Cars introduced in 2016